The WTA rankings are the Women's Tennis Association's (WTA) merit-based system for determining the rankings in women's tennis. In doubles, the top-ranked team is the pair who, over the previous 52 weeks, has gathered the most WTA rankings points. Points are awarded based on how far a team advances in tournaments and the category of those tournaments. The WTA has used a computerized system for determining doubles rankings since 1984.
The current number 1 doubles player is Kateřina Siniaková of the Czech Republic.

WTA No. 1 ranked doubles players 

Weeks at No. 1

Weeks at No. 1 leaders timeline

Year-end No. 1 players

Players who became No. 1 without having won a Grand Slam

Weeks at No. 1 by decade
 Note: Current active No. 1 indicated in italic.

1980s

1990s

2000s

2010s

2020s 

 * Stats are updated automatically on Mondays (UTC).

Weeks at No. 1 by country 
 Current No. 1 player indicated in bold.

See also 
 World number 1 ranked female tennis players (includes rankings before 1975)
 ITF World Champions
 List of WTA number 1 ranked singles tennis players
 List of ATP number 1 ranked singles tennis players
 List of ATP number 1 ranked doubles tennis players
 Current WTA rankings
 Top ten ranked female tennis players
 Top ten ranked female tennis players (1921–1974)
 List of highest ranked tennis players per country

References 

 
1
1